Živko Topalović (21 March 1886 in Užice – 11 February 1972 in Vienna) was a Yugoslav socialist politician. Topalović became a leading figure in the Socialist Party of Yugoslavia, founded in 1921.

Topalović represented Yugoslavia in the executive of the Labour and Socialist International between May 1923 and January 1929. He shared his seat with the Bulgarian socialist leader Yanko Sakazov until August 1925, then sharing it with Bolesław Drobner of the Independent Socialist Labour Party of Poland until June 1928 and from June 1928 to January 1929 with Joseph Kruk.

He graduated from the University of Belgrade's Law School. During the Second World War, Topalović became a close associate with the Chetnik leader Draža Mihailović. Topalović became the president of the Ba Congress held in village Ba and assembled by Mihailović. During this congress Topalović proposed that Bosnia should be fourth federal unit, besides Serbia, Croatia and Slovenia, but this was opposed by Dragiša Vasić and Stevan Moljević.

His books were banned by the Yugoslav government in 1947.

References

Sources
 
 

1886 births
1972 deaths
Serbian military personnel of the Balkan Wars
Serbian military personnel of World War I
Chetnik personnel of World War II
Military personnel from Užice
Socialist Party of Yugoslavia politicians
Members of the Executive of the Labour and Socialist International
University of Belgrade Faculty of Law alumni
Serbian anti-communists
Serbian socialists
Royal Serbian Army soldiers
Politicians from Užice